CRSI or CrSi may refer to:

Calorie Restriction Society International
Chemical Research Society of India
 Community Refugee Sponsorship Initiative, a joint project by Refugee Council of Australia and other organisations
Concrete Reinforcing Steel Institute
Cryptology Research Society of India
Chromium monosilicide, a chemical compound with a formula CrSi